In mathematics, the well-ordering principle states that every non-empty set of positive integers contains a least element.

The phrase "well-ordering principle" is sometimes taken to be synonymous with the "well-ordering theorem". On other occasions it is understood to be the proposition that the set of integers  contains a well-ordered subset, called the natural numbers, in which every nonempty subset contains a least element.

Properties
Depending on the framework in which the natural numbers are introduced, this (second order) property of the set of natural numbers is either an axiom or a provable theorem. For example:
 In Peano arithmetic, second-order arithmetic and related systems, and indeed in most (not necessarily formal) mathematical treatments of the well-ordering principle, the principle is derived from the principle of mathematical induction, which is itself taken as basic. 
 Considering the natural numbers as a subset of the real numbers, and assuming that we know already that the real numbers are complete (again, either as an axiom or a theorem about the real number system), i.e., every bounded (from below) set has an infimum, then also every set  of natural numbers has an infimum, say .
 In axiomatic set theory, the natural numbers are defined as the smallest inductive set (i.e., set containing 0 and closed under the successor operation). One can (even without invoking the regularity axiom) show that the set of all natural numbers  such that " is well-ordered" is inductive, and must therefore contain all natural numbers; from this property one can conclude that the set of all natural numbers is also well-ordered.

In the second sense, this phrase is used when that proposition is relied on for the purpose of justifying proofs that take the following form: to prove that every natural number belongs to a specified set , assume the contrary, which implies that the set of counterexamples is non-empty and thus contains a smallest counterexample.  Then show that for any counterexample there is a still smaller counterexample, producing a contradiction.  This mode of argument is the contrapositive of proof by complete induction. It is known light-heartedly as the "minimal criminal" method and is similar in its nature to Fermat's method of "infinite descent".

Garrett Birkhoff and Saunders Mac Lane wrote in A Survey of Modern Algebra that this property, like the least upper bound axiom for real numbers, is non-algebraic; i.e., it cannot be deduced from the algebraic properties of the integers (which form an ordered integral domain).

References
 

Wellfoundedness
Mathematical principles

cs:Princip dobrého uspořádání